Katya Ida Coelho better known as Katya Coelho (born 13 August 1999) is an Indian professional Windsurfer from Goa. She is also a designer and illustrator. Coelho is currently India's only Women iQFoiler and is the first Indian to win an IQFoil Medal at the International Windsurfing Cup in July 2022 in Pattaya, Thailand.

Personal life 
Katya was born on August 13, 1999, to a former national windsurfing champion of India Donald Coehlo, who also introduced windsurfing in Goa at The Goa Beach Sports Academy (GBSA) in association with the Water & Beach Sports Promotion Forum. Her brother Dayne Edgar Agnelo Coelho is also a windsurfing champion. Together they are called Coelho siblings.

Windsurfing career 
 Coelho started windsurfing at the age of 11. At the age of 14 to compete in the 2014 Summer Youth Olympics.

Her awards include 10 national gold medals, and 2 bronze at the Asian Open Championship in Techno 2015. She also represented India at 2018 Asian Games Mixed RS:One along with her brother Dayne Edgar Agnelo Coelho as Team India.

In July 2022 Coelho represented India at the International Windsurfing Cup - Pattaya, Thailand and secured second place making her the first Indian to win an IQFoil Medal.

References

External links

1999 births
Living people
Indian female sailors (sport)
Sailors at the 2014 Summer Youth Olympics